Armentières is a commune in the Nord department in the Hauts-de-France region in northern France. It is part of the Métropole Européenne de Lille.

The motto of the town is Pauvre mais fière (Poor but proud).

Geography
Armentières lies on the Belgian border, northwest of the city of Lille, on the right bank of the river Lys.

History

In 1668, the town became French, along with most of the rest of French Flanders. At the end of the 19th century and the beginning of the 20th, Armentières acquired fame, being the “City of Fabric”. Industrial weaving, spinning and brewing grew in Armentières, benefitting from the presence of water.

Armentières particularly suffered during the World Wars although the town received two Military Crosses (one for World War I and the second for the Second World War) and the Legion d'Honneur. In Armentières and the surrounding areas, the military cemeteries are places of remembrance for the casualties of the World Wars. "Mademoiselle from Armentières" was a popular song among Allied soldiers in World War I.

During World War I, in October 1914, the town was the site of the Battle of Armentières. In April 1918, German troops shelled Armentières with mustard gas. British troops were forced to evacuate the area, but the Germans could not enter for two weeks because of the heavy contamination. Witnesses to the bombardment stated that the shelling was so heavy that liquid mustard gas ran in the streets.

Population

Heraldry

Railways

Armentières has a railway station on the line from Lille to Calais and Dunkirk.

It was commissioned in 1848 by the Chemins de Fer du Nord (Northern Railway Company). The buildings were completed in 1861.

The station is currently served by TER Hauts-de-France trains, on the routes between Lille-Flandres station and Dunkirk, and between Lille-Flandres and Hazebrouck.

Twin towns – sister cities

Armentières is twinned with:
 Litoměřice, Czech Republic
 Osterode am Harz, Germany
 Stalybridge, England, United Kingdom

Notable people
Amédée Fournier (1912–1992), cyclist, Olympic medalist
Jean Maurice Fiey (1914–1995), Church historian and Syriacist
Dany Boon (born 1966), actor and stand-up comedian
Martin Terrier (born 1997), footballer

Monuments

The belfry of Armentières was inscribed on the UNESCO World Heritage List in 2005 as part of the Belfries of Belgium and France site, and in recognition of their influence in the rise of municipal power in Europe. The belfry, just like the nearing city hall was designed by the architect Louis Marie Cordonnier and is open for visitors and tourists.

In fiction
Milady de Winter in The Three Musketeers hides in Armentières and is caught and executed there.

The bawdy song, Mademoiselle from Armentières, was popular amongst British and American troops during World War 1. There are multiple version of the lyrics, that mostly refer to a woman from the town.

See also
Communes of the Nord department

References

External links

Official website (in French)
The reconstruction of the town hall of Armentières after WW1  on the website "Remembrance Trails of the Great War in Northern France"

Communes of Nord (French department)
French Flanders